Yaroslav's Court (Yaroslavovo Dvorishche) was the princely compound in the city of Novgorod the Great. Today it is roughly the area around the Trade Mart, the St. Nicholas Cathedral, the Church of St. Procopius, and the Church of the Myrrh-bearing Women. The Trade Mart renovated and heavily modified in the sixteenth and seventeenth centuries, is all that is left of the princely palace itself. The prince also had a compound called the Riurik's Court (Riurikovo Gorodishche) south of the marketside of the city.

Yaroslav's Court is named after Yaroslav the Wise who, while prince of Novgorod in 988–1015, built a palace there. The Novgorodian veche often met in front of Yaroslav's Court and in 1224 several pagan sorcerers were burned at the stake there.  

According to the traditional scholarship, after the Novgorodians evicted Prince Vsevolod Mstislavich in 1136, Novgorod began electing their princes and forbade them from holding land in Novgorod. Yaroslav's Court then ceased to be a princely compound and the prince resided at Riurik's Court. Between 1113 and 1136, the Saint Nicholas Cathedral was built at the court. The cathedral is intact and is the second oldest building in Novgorod after the Saint Sophia Cathedral.

References

Novgorod Republic
Historic Monuments of Novgorod and Surroundings
Cultural heritage monuments of federal significance in Novgorod Oblast
Museums in Novgorod Oblast